Deirdre Madden (born 20 August 1960) is a novelist from Northern Ireland.

Career
Madden was born in Toomebridge, County Antrim and was educated at St Mary's Grammar School, Magherafelt. She proceeded to Trinity College, Dublin (BA) and then to the University of East Anglia (MA). 

In 1994 she was Writer-in-Residence at University College, Cork, and in 1997 was Writer Fellow at Trinity College, Dublin. She has travelled widely in Europe and has spent extended periods of time in both France and Italy.

Awards
Deirdre Madden has won various awards, including the Rooney Prize for Irish Literature, the Somerset Maugham Award and the Hennessy Award. She has been described as "a pivotal voice in Northern Irish writing, her understated yet complex fictions often touching on the religious and political turmoil of the North".

Works

Novels
 Hidden Symptoms (1986)
 The Birds of the Innocent Wood (1988)
 Remembering Light and Stone (1993)
 Nothing Is Black (1994)
 One by One in the Darkness (1996) – Orange Prize shortlist, 1997
 Authenticity (2002)
 Snake's Elbows (2005)
 Thanks for Telling Me, Emily (2007)
 Molly Fox's Birthday (2008)
 Time Present and Time Past (2013)

References

External links
 Christina Patterson, "Deirdre Madden: 'The Troubles are almost always in my work at some level'" (interview), The Guardian, 14 June 2013.
 2010 review of Molly Fox's Birthday in The New York Times Book Review
 

1960 births
Living people
Alumni of Trinity College Dublin
Alumni of the University of East Anglia
People from County Antrim
Women novelists from Northern Ireland
20th-century novelists from Northern Ireland
21st-century novelists from Northern Ireland
21st-century women writers from Northern Ireland
20th-century women writers from Northern Ireland